Michal Hrazdíra (born 6 November 1977) is a retired Czech cyclist. He competed at the 2004 Summer Olympics in the individual time trial and in the road race and finished in 14th place in the former event. 

His father Miloš (1945–1990) and elder brother Milan (born 1973) were also competitive cyclists.

References 

1977 births
Living people
Olympic cyclists of the Czech Republic
Cyclists at the 2004 Summer Olympics
Czech male cyclists
Sportspeople from Brno